A university college is a federated or affiliated academic university institution of a larger public university (often referred to as the "parent" campus). Federated and affiliated colleges have existed in Ontario, Canada, for over a century. The establishment of these institutions came from Christian religious groups. There are a total of 16 such university colleges in Ontario. 

University colleges share a number of characteristics: 

 Focus on undergraduate studies in the liberal arts and post-degree professional programs in the helping professions (i.e. social work, teaching, etc.)
 Experiential learning opportunities and student life rooted in altruism and social justice 
 Residence for students who wish to live on campus 
 A smaller campus community within a greater campus community (this experience is often advertised as the "best of both worlds")
Small class sizes 
 Student services and resources exclusively for those students for whom the university college is their home campus, referred to as "co-registration" due to simultaneous access to services of parent campus

Affiliated versus federated university colleges 
"Affiliated" and "federated" are often used interchangeably when describing a university college, but they have somewhat different legal relationship with the parent campus. For example, affiliated university colleges typically suspend their degree-granting powers so their students are able to officially earn their degree from the “parent” institution.  A federated university college differs in that, although it is a type of affiliation, it is where "two or more institutions come together to create a new university that is recognized by civic authorities and is eligible for government funding" (MacDonald, 2016).

List of Ontario university colleges

References

Tertiary education
Education in Ontario